Carpena, Cárpena or Carpeña is a Spanish surname of Italian origin. It is the hispanicised version of the Italian family name Carpegna, brought to Spain by Italian settlers, which is a habitational surname for people from the village of Carpegna in the Marche region. Notable people with the surname include:
 Homero Cárpena (1910–2001), Argentine film actor
 José María Martín Carpena (1950–2000), Spanish politician
 Nora Cárpena (born 1945), Argentinian actor
 Pepita Carpeña (1919–2005), Spanish anarchist

See also
Palacio de Deportes José María Martín Carpena, indoor sporting arena in Málaga, Spain

References

Spanish-language surnames
Surnames of Italian origin